International Game Technology (IGT) was an American gaming company based in Las Vegas which manufactured and distributed slot machines and other gaming technology. It was acquired in 2015 by GTECH, which then adopted the IGT name.

History

1975–1990
IGT was founded as A-1 Supply by William "Si" Redd in 1975. It changed its name to Sircoma in 1978, and then to International Game Technology in 1981. The company went public in 1981. A deciding factor in IGT's decision to go public occurred a few years earlier with the success of its video poker machine gaming product. This product served as a "foot in the door" for the company into several gaming arenas.

In 1984, IGT acquired Electronic Data Technologies making the company one of the first to use the computerized player tracking concept and later instrumental in the proliferation of "frequent-player rewards" programs, which remain popular in casinos to this day. This initial system gave casinos a new marketing tool in player management. Over time, the tracking system evolved into the company's IGT Advantage and sbX systems.

After IGT's initial public offering and listing on NASDAQ, the company debuted many new technologies over several years. A number of products resulted from this process including the S-Slot, which marked the company's entrance into the microprocessor-driven spinning-reel slot market; and the Player's Edge video poker machine. In addition, the company introduced the Nevada Megabucks slot machine, the world's first wide area progressive slot machine system. With an initial base top jackpot of $1 million, this new game allowed for million-dollar player payouts for casinos on the system. During this time, IGT also established an Australian office to focus on the country's club market.

1991–2000
In January 1991, a decade after its initial public offering, IGT was listed on the New York Stock Exchange (NYSE). The following year IGT Europe was established to service casinos across the continent. In 1994, international expansion continued with the opening of new sales and service offices in Argentina and South Africa. The NYSE also listed IGT as a top-performing stock that year.

Late in 1996, IGT debuted the Wheel of Fortune progressive slot. This game continues to be one of the most popular gaming machines of all time. The Game King video product featuring multi-denomination technology also was introduced during this time.

In 1998, IGT acquired Barcrest Gaming, located in the United Kingdom, and Sodak Gaming, IGT's gaming distributor for the Native American market.

In 1998, IGT introduced Triple Play Draw Poker through its partnership with Action Gaming;  and the Elvis themed slot machine. The new S2000 spinning reel slot machine system was brought to market in 1999.

2001–2012
In 2001, IGT became a member of Standard & Poor's 500 list. The company also continued to acquire gaming companies including Silicon Gaming and Anchor Gaming. The acquisition of Anchor Gaming resulted in doubling gaming operations revenue.

During 2003, IGT acquired Acres Gaming. The company's bonuses and systems technology were a significant addition to IGT's games and systems products.  In 2004, the company introduced its central determination system (CDS) as well as its Class II bingo games and systems to the Native American market. IGT Canada was established to serve the emerging Canadian lottery and gaming markets.

In 2005, IGT celebrated its 25th anniversary as a publicly traded company and also acquired WagerWorks for its online gaming technology. It was also the year the company unveiled its first multi-level progressive MegaJackpots product, Fort Knox. In an effort to take advantage of emerging markets, new IGT offices were opened in Macau, Mexico and Russia.

Group play and community bonus games were introduced to the marketplace in 2006 with the debut of Wheel of Fortune Special Edition. The company also celebrated the 10th anniversary of Wheel of Fortune slots, and the 20th anniversary of the Megabucks wide area progressive game.

During the Global Gaming Expo in Las Vegas in 2006, IGT unveiled the M-P Series. The new multi-player concept focused on roulette and baccarat and was the first of the company's electronic multi-player table game products.

In 2007, IGT worked to grow its Mexican gaming operation and product sales in the Japanese and Asian markets. In addition, a new IGT office was opened in China. Two intellectual property arrangements were also announced, these included an arrangement with Austrian-based Novomatic focusing on IGT's M-P Series multi-player product and with PureDepth, Inc. for its 3D-like, Multi-Layer Display (MLD) technology.

IGT opened the Global Technology & Interoperability Center in Reno, Nevada, early in 2008. This first-of-its-kind research and testing center encompasses a  facility, which is available for use by gaming manufacturers, customers and third-party gaming products manufacturers. The collaborative center focuses on product testing in a true-to-life casino atmosphere prior to market release.  In an effort to diversify business and market opportunities in the United Kingdom, the company acquired Cyberview Technology, Inc.

The company opened IGT Technology Development (Beijing) Co., Ltd. in Beijing, China, in March 2009. The office was established to research and develop gaming, application and systems in addition to providing support, technical services and training.

In 2009, Patti S. Hart was named IGT's new president and CEO. That year also saw the release of sbX Tier One package by IGT Network Systems.  The sbX system offers a bank-by-bank solution, which gives casino operators the ability to implement server-based technology without the need to commit the entire casino floor.

Sex and the City Slots were introduced in fall 2009 in the United States. This game features entertaining game play, bonus rounds on a multi-level progressive jackpots platform.

The year ended with IGT's sbX Experience Management System being installed at ARIA Resort & Casino at CityCenter in Las Vegas.  ARIA's casino floor opened with a first-of-its-kind combination of IGT systems on the server-based network, including IGT Advantage and sbX.

IGT started 2010 with a repeat win at the International Gaming Awards as Best Slot Manufacturer of the Year and continued to win awards throughout the year. These included 16 awards in Casino Player magazine's Best of Gaming for 2010, top honors in Global Gaming Business' 8th Annual Gaming and Technology Awards, wins in the inaugural Casino Enterprise Management Hospitality Operations Technology Awards, and 35 awards in Strictly Slots Best of Slots Awards.

In the spring of 2010, IGT's sbX Experience Management System was installed in the first European locations as sbX went live at Casino d'Evian in France. This was followed by a number of additional European installations including Casino di Venezia in Italy  and Grand Casino Helsinki in Finland.

In November 2010, the Company celebrated the production of its two millionth slot machine.

Late 2010 also saw the creation of an Interactive division within IGT dedicated to further building its online and mobile gaming presence. IGT's WagerWorks and Million-2-1 groups merged into a single global division headquartered in San Francisco, California. This new division provides gaming products to online and mobile markets in regulated, legal markets globally.

The year ended with a substantial go-live for both IGT's network systems products and games. The new casino resort The Cosmopolitan of Las Vegas opened floor-wide in sbX; the majority floor share of games; plus, an entire suite of IGT Advantage system products.

IGT acquired Entraction in 2011. A poker network with headquarters in Stockholm, Sweden. It also acquired Double Down in 2012, a Facebook game company with its headquarters in Seattle.

2013–present
In January 2013, IGT filed its preliminary proxy materials and indicated that it had received a Notice of Intent to Nominate four director candidates for election to the IGT Board at the Company's 2013 Annual Meeting through The Ader Group, run by Jason Ader.  The intent of the notice was to inform IGT and its shareholders of a proxy battle that was going to take place, and that the Ader group's nominees include the slot-machine maker's former chief executive Charles Mathewson, and Jason Ader himself.

Following the initial release by IGT, The Ader Group issued a statement claiming that IGT relayed inaccurate information concerning Jason Ader and the Ader Group's proxy fight.  The initial filing with the Securities and Exchange Commission by IGT suggested that Ader's group seeks election to the board, as Ader and Mathewson control 3 percent of IGT, (8.05 million shares), and they are seeking additional proxies for the company's 2013 annual shareholder meeting to put Mathewson back on the board IGT.  IGT maintained its original statement.

On January 11, 2013, the Ader Group filed its proxy indicating that it had nominated three people for the IGT board, of which Jason Ader was not one of the candidates.  The proxy statement charged IGT has lost value as a result of the decisions and direction of its leadership.

The Ader Group filed its action letter outlining its reasons for the proxy fight and urging stockholders to vote for the Gold slate on January 28, 2013.

In July 2014, Italian gaming equipment company Gtech agreed to acquire IGT for a total of $6.4 billion, including $4.7 billion in cash and $1.7 billion in assumed debt. The companies would be combined under a new holding company based in the United Kingdom and the Gtech name would be dropped.

On April 7, 2015, Gtech completed its merger with IGT, the new merger was named as International Game Technology PLC.

IGT games

Slots

Wheel of Fortune
The Price Is Right
Jeopardy!
Family Feud
Let's Make a Deal
Sale of the Century
The Dating Game
The Newlywed Game
The Joker's Wild
The $25,000 Pyramid
The $100,000 Pyramid
The $1,000,000 Pyramid
Megabucks
Sex and the City
The Amazing Race
Star Wars
Elvis
Top Dollar
Double Diamond
Red, White & Blue
Super Times Pay
Wolf Run
Cleopatra
Cats
Kitty Glitter
White Orchid
Siberian Storm
Golden Goddess
Black Widow
Pharaohs Fortune
Hexbreaker

Video poker

Triple/Five/Ten Play
Triple Chance Poker
100 Play
All Star Poker
Super Times Pay
Spin Poker
Multi-Strike Poker
Ultimate X
Quick Quads

Interactive wagering
In 2005, IGT purchased the UK focused online gaming supplier Wagerworks for $90 million.  Wagerworks supplies casino and slot games to various online gaming sites, including Paddy Power, William Hill and Betfair.  The company provides over 100 real money wagering options for customers in legalized jurisdictions.  Currently online gaming is prohibited in the US, due to the Unlawful Internet Gambling Enforcement Act of 2006.  With an increasing focus on New Media and online distribution channels IGT announced the appointment of Gideon Bierer in January 2010 to head up the division, based in San Francisco. The interactive division also has offices in Paddington, London.

When the new Interactive division debuted in late 2010, IGT's separate mobile- and internet-based gaming groups, known as Million-2-1 and WagerWorks, merged and formed one team with 18 years combined experience. IGT Interactive provides regulatory-compliant casino games content and platform solutions including the wide area progressive MegaJackpots series. IGT Interactive's mobile portfolio includes mobile slot, table, lottery and SMS games, mobile marketing, and platform products across all major mobile technologies including Apple and Android.

In March 2011, the IGT Interactive division moved to 405 Howard Street, Suite 600, in San Francisco, California, and announced plans to add 75 positions to their staff. The new Interactive division headquarters, located at the corner of First and Howard in the heart of SOMA, is home to 100 employees today with the ability to accommodate more than 250. The new  office triples IGT's total office space in San Francisco, allowing IGT to consolidate employees from two different locations in San Francisco, while also allowing for additional growth.

IGT online game titles include:

Slots games

3 Reel Hold up
Arabian Riches
Back To The Future
Banana Rama Deluxe
Battleship Search and Destroy
Bitten
Captain Quid's Treasure Quest
Captain Jackpot's Cash Ahoy
Cats
Cleopatra
Cleopatra 2
Cluedo Who Won It
Coyote Moon
DaVinci Diamonds
Davinci Diamonds Dual Play
Deal or No Deal
Diamond Queen
Double Diamond
Dungeons and Dragons Crystal Cavern
Dungeons and Dragons Fortress of Fortune
Elvis A Little More Action
Elvis Multi Strike
Elvis Top 20
Enchanted Unicorn
Fire Opals
Five Times Pay
Grand Monarch
Jeopardy!
Jackpot Jewels
Kitty Glitter
Lil' Lady
Monopoly Here and Now
Monopoly Multiplier
Monopoly Pass Go
Monopoly You're In the Money
Multi-Slot Jackpot Extreme
Noah's Ark
Pet's Pay Day
Pharaoh's Fortune
Pixies of the Forest
Rainbow Riches Win Big Shindig
Siberian Storm
Star Trek
Star Trek Against All Odds
Super Hoot Loot
Texas Tea
The 50000 Pyramid
The 100000 Pyramid
The War of the Worlds
Transformers Ultimate Payback
Treasures of Troy
Triple Fortune Dragon
Vacation USA
Vegas, Baby
Wheel of Fortune Hollywood Edition
Wheel of Fortune Triple Action Frenzy
White Orchid
Wild Wolf
Wolf Run

Table games

Baccarat
Caribbean Stud Poker
Texas Hold 'Em Bonus
Texas Hold 'Em Shootout
Three Card Second Chance
Wan Doy Pairs Poker
21+3 Blackjack
Blackjack
European Blackjack
Hot Streak Blackjack
Power Blackjack
Vegas Blackjack with 21+ Bonus
Three Wheel Roulette
Double Bonus Spin Roulette
Grande Roulette
Hot Streak Roulette
Pinball Roulette
Triple Bonus Spin Roulette

Power Blackjack and Three Card Second Chance are unique to IGT online casinos. Three Card Second Chance was developed by gaming consultant and casino game analyst Michael Shackleford also known as The Wizard of Odds.

References

Companies based in Reno, Nevada
Slot machine manufacturers
Companies based in Spring Valley, Nevada
Gambling companies of the United States
Defunct gambling companies
Gambling companies established in 1975
Gambling companies disestablished in 2015
1975 establishments in Nevada
2015 disestablishments in Nevada
2015 mergers and acquisitions
Electronics companies established in 1975
Electronics companies disestablished in 2015